Avalum Naanum is a Tamil-language family soap opera starring Mounika Devi in a dual role opposite Amruth and Dharish, and is directed by Dhanush. It started airing on 26 February 2018 on Vijay TV in an afternoon programming block called "Vijay Matinee Thodargal". Mounika and Amruth who play the lead roles, are making their Tamil-language debuts with the series. The show is a family melodrama based on twin girls Nila and Diya (both played by Mounika Devi). It has ended on 22 June 2019.

Synopsis
Nila and Diya (Mounika Devi) are identical twin sisters. Nila's parents try to force her to marry Praveen (Amruth) because he comes from a wealthy family even though they know Nila loves Vijay (Shri Mahadev) and wants to focus on her career. On her wedding day, she leaves a note for her father and leaves for Pondicherry to be with Vijay. Diya's father, Sathyamoorthy (Supergood Kannan), forces Diya to pretend to be Nila and marry Praveen for the sake of the family's reputation. After the wedding ceremony is over, Diya's boyfriend Aravind (Dharish) comes as a guest and discovers the twin switch. He tries to help Diya stand up to her parents because she can be a bit of a pushover.

Meanwhile, Nila marries Vijay, but he is killed in a road accident on the wedding day and she becomes a widow.  Vijay's relatives, except for her father in law and brother in law, blame her for his death. She tries to return home but her mother Gayathri almosts kills her in a fit of rage. Her father Saythamoorthy pretends to disown her to save her from her mother's wrath. Nila returns to Pondicherry with her father in law and earns the love and respect of her in-laws by saving her mother in law's life.

Diya wants to tell the truth and leave Praveen's house but her parents abandon her for some time and then emotionally blackmail her into keeping the secret. Aravind is brainwashed by his sister in law, Kavitha, who is very greedy and believes that Diya has betrayed him for money and consequently plans to get revenge on her.  Diya also discovers that Aravind took money from her parents to stay quiet about the twin switch so now she hates him too. During this time, Praveen constantly bothers Diya to accept him and claims to be in love with her even though he knows nothing about her, not even her real name. Diya eventually also falls in love with him. Diya understands Praveen's love for her and she accepts for the first night function where Diya and Praveen are supposed to consummate their marriage.  Diya is a girl who believes in marriage she even once told manasa that whatever wish  a girl may have, a girl's life starts only with marriage and a girl is one who takes care of the family and get children for the future generations.  Aravind becomes furious after discovering that Diya and Praveen have consummated their marriage

Manasa, Praveen's sister falls in love with Aravind, who pretends to love her so he can also marry into a rich family and get a job at Manasa's dad's company. He manipulates the whole family against Diya who tries everything to prove Aravind is a bad guy. Diya tries to stop their engagement by telling the truth about the twin switch to save Manasa from Aravind's trickery but her mother pushes her down the stairs and she falls into a coma. Nila also comes home in this time to try and help Diya stop the Aravind-Manasa engagement.  Sathyamurthy and Gayathri emotionally blackmail Nila into pretending to be Praveen's wife until the engagement is over so Diya doesn't lose more respect in the family. After the engagement they learn that the doctor is uncertain if Diya will ever regain her consciousness.

Nila decides to keep up the facade as Praveen's wife until Diya wakes up so that she can stop Aravind and Kavitha's evil plan. Praveen claims to be in love with Nila but he doesn't even know which twin she is and tries to sleep with both of them. He gets very mad that Nila isn't interested in him and gets angry at her whenever she tries to help the rest of the family but not pay attention to him.

Kavitha, Aravind and Manimaaran, the union leader at Praveen's company, come up with a plan to scam the company.  Aravind's brother Prabhakhar doesn't like their plan so he tries to expose the truth, but they keep him captive and eventually kill him. They also turn everyone in the family against Nila and she is kicked out of the house until Manasa-Aravind wedding is over.  Diya wakes up from the coma and is very mad at Nila for her actions and wants Praveen back even though Praveen doesn't even recognize her as his real wife when she goes to meet him. Eventually Nila proves Kavitha, Aravind and Manimaaran were involved in murdering Prabhakhar, and Kavitha is arrested. Aravind goes to Praveen's house to tell the entire family the truth about the wedding day and twin switch before he also gets arrested. At the same time, Nila and Diya are heading to Praveen's house to tell them about Kavitha's arrest and try to get Diya back in the house as Praveen's wife the fake Nila. Aravind gets arrested because he tries to shoot Praveen but Nila saves Praveen get the shoot at neck. After a sequence of events, Praveen parents engaged Manasa to Vasanth. During Manasa and Vasanth engagement everyone know the truth about Nila and Diya.

Praveen's family are once again angry  with Diya's family, and kicks out Diya out of the family. Praveen's  mother manipulates Praveen to file a mutual divorce or else will file a complaint to the police on the Nila and Diya switching identies. Praveen agrees for a mutual divorce, and Diya simply accepts it. Praveen's mother finds a bride, Sandhya for Praveen once the divorce is given.  Sandhya meets Diya and asks Diya to be her maid of honor, Diya accepts it. Praveen  realizes he loves Diya but unable to say it because of his mother forcing to marry Sandhya. After a series of events  Sandhya and Nila makes plans to test the love Praveen has for Diya. The divorce was granted for Diya and Praveen. At the wedding, Sandhya said she cannot marry Praveen because Praveen has given his heart to Diya. Sandya pushes Diya and Praveen tied the knot. The show ended with Diya saying she is pregnant.

Cast

Main
 Mounika Devi as Nila Vijay and Diya Praveen (Dual Role)
 Amruth Kalam as Praveen Rajendran (Diya's husband)
 Dharish  as Aravind (Diya's ex-Boyfriend, Main Antagonist)
 Shri Mahadev as Vijay Ravishankar (Nila's husband, Died in the serial, Ep: 1-34)

 Nila's & Diya's family
 Supergood Kannan as Sathyamurthy (Nila's, Diya's  Father)
 Sri Latha as Gayathri Sathyamurthy (Nila's, Diya's  Mother)

 Praveen's family
 Kiru Baji as Parvathy Rajendran (Praveen's mother)
 Shyam Gopal (Ep: 1-167) and Shridhar (Ep: 168-380) as Rajendran (Praveen's father)
 Reshma Reshu as Swetha (Praveen's elder sister)
 Koushik as Sundeep (Swetha's husband)
 Dharsha Gupta (Ep: 5-124) and Preethi (Ep: 125-185) and Suju Vasan (Ep: 186-266) and Fouzil Hidhayah (Ep: 267-380) as Manasa (Praveen's younger sister)
 Santhosh as Dinesh (Praveen's cousin, Ep: 69-70)

 Aravind's family
 S.Kavitha as Kavitha Prabhakar (Aravind's sister-in-law, Antagonist, Ep: 46-308)
 Neelakandan as Prabhakar (Aravind's elder brother, Died in the serial, Ep: 46-225)

 Vijay's family
 Sanjay Saravanan as Vasanth Kumar (Vijay's cousin)
 Sathyapriya as Bhanumathi (Vijay's, Vasanth's grandmother)
 Guru Hawkman as Ravishankar (Vijay's father and Nila's father in Law)
 Banu Bharathwaj as Madhavi Ravishankar (Vijay's mother)
 Balasubramani (Ep: 3-158) and Unknown (Ep: 263-380) as Umashankar (Vasanth's father, Antagonist)
 Baby Joyce as Mythili Umashankar (Vasanth's mother)

 Others
 Dhivya Sri Rengaraja as Sandhya (Ep: 347-380)
 Moses R Wilky as Manimaaran

Production

Casting
The series is a twin sisters family story. Mounika Devi in a dual role plays Nila and Diya, Amruth, plays Praveen and Kannada Television actor Naveen / Shri Mahadev plays a supporting role. Official teaser has been released by Star Vijay in YouTube on 11 February 2018.

References

External links
Official website at Hotstar

Star Vijay original programming
Tamil-language romance television series
2010s Tamil-language television series
2018 Tamil-language television series debuts
Tamil-language television shows
2019 Tamil-language television series endings